Michael Kamau (born 1958) is a Kenyan civil servant who was nominated by President Uhuru Kenyatta as Cabinet Secretary for Transport and Infrastructure on 25 April 2013. He was suspended from the Cabinet on 28 March 2015   on allegations of corruption and charged in court with abuse of office on 4 June 2015. He was replaced by James Macharia in an acting capacity.

References

1958 births
University of Nairobi alumni
Alumni of Newcastle University
Living people